Mehrhoog is a railway station in Mehrhoog, part of Hamminkeln, North Rhine-Westphalia, Germany. The station is located on the Arnhem-Oberhausen railway. The train services are operated by VIAS.

Train services
The station is served by the following services:

Regional services  Arnhem - Emmerich - Wesel - Oberhausen - Duisburg - Düsseldorf

Bus services

 86 (Rees - Mehr - Mehrhoog - Bislich - Flüren - Wesel - Lauerhaus - Wittenberg)

References

External links
NIAG Website 

Railway stations in North Rhine-Westphalia